The Capital Ring is a strategic walking route promoted by London's 33 local councils, led by the City of London Corporation in partnership with the Greater London Authority and its functional body for regional transport, Transport for London, through which much of the funding is provided. It is called a "ring" because the route completely encircles inner and central London. The official start of the route is the Woolwich foot tunnel, but the nature of the route means that it can be started or finished at any point. The route signs feature a logo showing Big Ben in a ring of arrows.

The idea originated in 1990 at one of the early meetings of the London Walking Forum, and the route was completed in September 2005.  It passes through green areas of urban and suburban London.

Route sections
Some Capital Ring sections start and/or end at public transport stops.  However, most sections involve a further signposted 'Capital Ring Link' to the nearest train or underground station. Additionally, there are waymarked 'Capital Ring Links' to stations midway along some sections.

Route descriptions

South-east London
Here the Capital Ring comprises three walks, 1 to 3. These are part of the South East London Green Chain. It starts from the Woolwich foot tunnel and ends in Crystal Palace Park.  Points of interest in this section include the Thames Barrier, Severndroog Castle, Eltham Palace and the remains of The Crystal Palace.

South London
In this section, the trail comprises two walks, walk 4 and 5.  Points of interest in this section include Biggin Wood (one of the few remnants of the Great North Wood), Streatham Common, Tooting Bec Lido and Wandsworth Common. The part around Balham and Earlsfield is the nearest part of the ring to central London (about 4.5 miles from Charing Cross).

South-west London
Here the Capital Ring comprises two walks, walk 6 and 7. Walk 6 consists of a brief walk through suburban Wimbledon Park, then crosses Wimbledon Common and then Richmond Park.  While the route passes within about 100 metres of King Henry VIII's Mound, with its protected view of St Paul's Cathedral, this is not indicated on the signposts for the route. Walk 7 continues from Richmond along the Thames, before deviating through old Isleworth, then through the grounds of Syon Park.  It then continues along the Grand Union Canal to Osterley Lock.

West and north-west London
Here the Capital Ring comprises two walks, walk 8 and 9.  Points of interest in this section include the River Brent, the Wharncliffe Viaduct, Horsenden Hill (with panoramic views) and Harrow School. The Capital Ring's most distant part from central London is in near Harrow (about 10 miles from Charing Cross).

North London
The Capital Ring comprises two walks, walk 10 and 11, in North London.

Walk 10 starts from South Kenton railway station, crosses Preston Park and passes Preston Road underground station, before reaching Fryent Country Park. It then heads south and east to Brent Reservoir and West Hendon where it crosses the Edgware Road, M1 motorway and A41 to reach Hendon Park, near Hendon Central Underground station.

Walk 11 starts at Hendon Park, again following the River Brent and Mutton Brook through Hampstead Garden Suburb. It passes East Finchley Underground station, Cherry Tree Wood and Highgate Wood (complete with a tea shop, interpretive display, and green grassy picnic area). From here it passes through Queen's Wood to the Northern Line's Highgate Underground station.

North-east London
The Capital Ring is made up of two walks, walk 12 and 13. Walk 12 covers Highgate to Stoke Newington, and walk 13 Stoke Newington to Hackney Wick.

Walk 12 starts at the Priory Gardens entrance to Highgate Underground station and follows the Parkland Walk past Crouch End to Finsbury Park. After crossing the park it follows the New River past the Stoke Newington reservoirs. It then crosses Clissold Park and Abney Park Cemetery before reaching Stoke Newington railway station; Stoke Newington is also served by the 73 bus. Walk 13 heads east through the streets of Lower Clapton to Springfield Park before following the River Lee Navigation south through Lea Bridge to White Post Lane, near Hackney Wick railway station.

East London
In this area, the Capital Ring comprises two walks. Walk 14 passes through the area used for the London 2012 Summer Olympics, including the new Pudding Mill Lane DLR station. This walk follows The Greenway for most of its distance passing Abbey Mills Pumping Station, sometimes known as the ‘Cathedral of Sewage’, that was built by Joseph Bazalgette. Walk 15 explores docklands with fine views over the Thames, the Royal Albert Dock and London City Airport. This walk ends at the Woolwich foot tunnel under the Thames which leads back to the start of the Ring.

Length
Authorities do not agree on the length of the route.

Further reading

Detailed, guidance for walking the Capital Ring (2020) updated by Ramblers volunteers - free downloads from the Inner London Ramblers web site.

See also
London Outer Orbital Path – a longer walking route around outer London.

References

External links

Official Transport for London site with maps of each walk
Inner London Ramblers web site with updated maps and guidance for walking each section.
Observer Feature by Stephen Emms on Capital Ring
London Capital Ring Blog
Photos and description of a walk taken around the Capital Ring during 2006
Greenchain.com – official site of the southeast section of the Capital Ring
Full route on OpenStreetMap
The Capital Ring on the Go Jauntly app, in partnership with Transport for London.

Walking in London
Transport in the London Borough of Croydon
Long-distance footpaths in England
Footpaths in London